The "World's Largest Buffalo Monument" is a sculpture of an American Bison located in Jamestown, North Dakota at the Frontier Village. It is visible from Interstate 94, overlooking the city from above the James River valley. The statue is a significant tourist draw for Jamestown and the source of its nickname, The Buffalo City.

Description
It was constructed with stucco and cement around a steel beam frame shaped with wire mesh.

The sculpture is complete in many respects of detail. It is sculptured after a male bison in mid-stride and is anatomically correct.

History
The sculpture was commissioned in 1959 by local businessman Harold Newman, designed by Elmer Petersen, Jamestown College Art Professor and sculptor, and constructed under Peterson's supervision by professional construction workers and community members.

The final construction cost was approximately US$8,500 in 1969; a significant overrun from initial estimates closer to $4,600. The concrete slab that lies under the sculpture was added later and was not included in the initial cost.

When originally constructed, the statue stood alone on a hill south of Jamestown. Beginning in the mid-1960s, the city began expanding the site with the collection of a small number of historic buildings moved there in an attempt to recreate the look of a small Midwestern town in the 1800s. Named Frontier Village, the project has grown over the years to encompass several acres (hectares) with a complex of buildings and other attractions, including the National Buffalo Museum. However, the Buffalo remains the featured attraction.

In June 2007, the city of Jamestown received a grant of $16,500 from Hampton Hotels' Save-A-Landmark program to refurbish the buffalo. The money was used to repaint the buffalo to look more lifelike and to enlarge the horns.  Original designer Elmer Petersen directly oversaw the renovation.

On July 24, 2010, the World's Largest Buffalo was named "Dakota Thunder", after a contest that drew more than 3,500 entries.

References

External links
 Jamestown, ND Tourism website
 National Buffalo Museum website
 Real ND World's Largest Buffalo Page
 Hampton Landmarks

Outdoor sculptures in North Dakota
Buildings and structures in Jamestown, North Dakota
Tourist attractions in Stutsman County, North Dakota
Roadside attractions in North Dakota
1959 sculptures
Bison in art
Stucco sculptures
Construction records
Colossal statues in the United States
1959 establishments in North Dakota
Animal sculptures in the United States
Sculptures of bovines